In etymology, two or more words in the same language are called doublets or etymological twins or twinlings (or possibly triplets, and so forth) when they have different phonological forms but the same etymological root. Often, but not always, the words entered the language through different routes. Given that the kinship between words that have the same root and the same meaning is fairly obvious, the term is mostly used to characterize pairs of words that have diverged at least somewhat in meaning. For example, English pyre and fire are doublets with merely associated meanings despite both descending ultimately from the same Proto-Indo-European (PIE) word *.

Words with similar meanings but subtle differences contribute to the richness of modern English, and many of these are doublets. A good example consists of the doublets frail and fragile. (These are both ultimately from the Latin adjective , but frail evolved naturally through its slowly changing forms in Old French and Middle English, whereas fragile is a learned borrowing directly from Latin in the 15th century.)

Another example of nearly synonymous doublets is aperture and overture (the commonality behind the meanings is "opening"). But doublets may develop divergent meanings, such as the opposite words host and guest, which come from the same PIE word * and already existed as a doublet in Latin, and then Old French, before being borrowed into English. Doublets also vary with respect to how far their forms have diverged. For example, the connection between levy and levee is easy to guess, whereas the connection between sovereign and soprano is harder to guess.

Origin
Doublets can develop in various ways, according to which route the two forms took from the origin to their current form. Complex, multi-step paths are possible, though in many cases groups of terms follow the same path. Simple paths are discussed below, with the simplest distinction being that doublets in a given language can have their root in the same language (or an ancestor), or may originate in a separate language.

Native origin
Most simply, a native word can at some point split into two distinct forms, staying within a single language, as with English too which split from to.

Alternatively, a word may be inherited from a parent language, and a cognate borrowed from a separate sister language. In other words, one route was direct inheritance, while the other route was inheritance followed by borrowing. In English this means one word inherited from a Germanic source, with, e.g., a Latinate cognate term borrowed from Latin or a Romance language. In English this is most common with words which can be traced back to Indo-European languages, which in many cases share the same proto-Indo-European root, such as Romance beef and Germanic cow. However, in some cases the branching is more recent, dating only to proto-Germanic, not to PIE; many words of Germanic origin occur in French and other Latinate languages, and hence in some cases were both inherited by English (from proto-Germanic) and borrowed from French or another source – see List of English Latinates of Germanic origin. The forward linguistic path also reflects cultural and historical transactions; often the name of an animal comes from Germanic while the name of its cooked meat comes from Romance. Since English is unusual in that it borrowed heavily from two distinct branches of the same language family tree – Germanic and Latinate/Romance – it has a relatively high number of this latter type of etymological twin. See list of Germanic and Latinate equivalents in English for further examples and discussion.

Less commonly, a native word may be borrowed into a foreign language, then reborrowed back into the original language, existing alongside the original term. An English example is animation and anime "Japanese animation", which was reborrowed from Japanese  .

Borrowed origin
In case of twins of foreign origin, which consist of two borrowings (of related terms), one can distinguish if the borrowing is of a term and a descendant, or of two cognate terms (siblings).

Etymological twins are often a result of chronologically separate borrowing from a source language. In the case of English, this usually means once from French during the Norman invasion, and again later, after the word had evolved separately in French. An example of this is warranty and guarantee.

Another possibility is borrowing from both a language and its daughter language. In English this is usually Latin and some other Romance language, particularly French – see Latin influence in English. The distinction between this and the previous is whether the source language has changed to a different language or not.

Less directly, a term may be borrowed both directly from a source language and indirectly via an intermediate language. In English this is most common in borrowings from Latin, and borrowings from French that are themselves from Latin; less commonly from Greek directly and through Latin.

In case of borrowing cognate terms, rather than descendants, most simply an existing doublet can be borrowed: two contemporary twin terms can be borrowed.

More remotely, cognate terms from different languages can be borrowed, such as sauce (Old French) and salsa (Spanish), both ultimately from Latin, or tea (Dutch ) and chai (Hindi), both ultimately from Chinese. This last pair reflects the history of how tea has entered English via different trade routes.

By language

English
Many thousands of English examples can be found, grouped according to their earliest deducible Indo-European ancestor. In some cases over a hundred English words can be traced to a single root. Some examples in English include:

host and guest: via Latin and Germanic
strange and extraneous: Old French, Latin
word and verb: Germanic, Latin
shadow, shade, and shed, all from Old English  "shadow, shade"
stand, stay, state, status, and static: native, Middle French, Latin (twice), and Ancient Greek via Latin, all from the same Indo-European root
 chief, chef, cape, capo, caput, and head: French (twice), Latin via French, Italian, Latin, and Germanic, all from the same Indo-European word * "head")
secure and sure: Latin, French
capital, cattle, and chattel: Latin, Norman French, and standard French
plant and clan: Latin, Latin via Old Irish
right, rich, raj, rex, regalia, regal, reign, royal, and real: Germanic, Celtic, Sanskrit, Latin (twice), French (three times), and Portuguese cognates, all ultimately from Proto-Indo-European h₃reǵ- "to straighten, to right oneself, right, just"
carton and cartoon, both ultimately Italian  "carton"
ward and guard: Old English, French, both originally Germanic; also warden and guardian
chrism and cream: Greek via Latin, Greek via Latin and French
cow and beef: Germanic via Old English, Latin via French; both ultimately Proto-Indo-European gʷṓws
pipe and fife: both from Germanic, via Old English and German
wheel, cycle, and chakra: Germanic, Greek via Latin, Sanskrit, all from Proto-Indo-European * "wheel"
frenetic and frantic: Greek, via Old French and Latin
cave and cavern, from Latin , via French and Germanic languages
direct, from Latin, and derecho, from Latin via Spanish
price, prise, prize, praise, pry (a lever), and prix, all from French, some diverged in English
corn, kernel and grain, all ultimately from Proto-Indo-European *, the first two natively via Proto-Germanic (g → k), the last via Latin, borrowed from Old French
clock, cloche, cloak, and glockenspiel, from Medieval Latin  "bell", via Middle Dutch, French (twice) and German
pique and pike (weapon), both from Middle French 
mister, master, meister, maestro, mistral (a Mediterranean wind), and magistrate are all ultimately derived from Latin  "teacher"
equip, ship, skiff, and skipper, from Old French, Old English, Old Italian via Middle French, and Middle Dutch, all from Proto-Germanic  "ship"
domain, demesne, dominion, and dungeon, all from French
Slav and slave, from Latin and French, both ultimately from Proto-Slavic via Greek
 hemp and cannabis, the former natively through Proto-Germanic, the latter via Greek and Latin, both ultimately from either Proto-Indo-European or a very early shared borrowing from Scythian or Thracian
 discrete and discreet, from Latin, diverged in English, now homophones
 apothecary, boutique, and bodega, all ultimately from Greek via Latin and then, respectively, via Old French, via Old Occitan and Middle French, and via Spanish.
 care, charity, cheer, cherish, and whore, from French, Anglo-Norman, and Germanic, all ultimately from Proto-Indo-European *, * "dear; loved"
 garden and yard, the former via Anglo-Norman, the latter through Germanic.
 zealous and jealous, the former from Greek, the latter via Old French.
tradition and treason: Latin via Old French.
 short,  shirt,  skirt  and curt, the first two from Old English, the third from Old Norse and the fourth from Latin, all ultimately from the Proto-Indo-European *, "to cut"
 reave and rob, the former from Old English, the latter from Frankish and Old High German via Latin, via Anglo-Norman, all ultimately from Proto-Germanic , "to steal"
 think and thank, both ultimately from the Proto-Indo-European *teng-, “to think”. “Thank” meant “to give kind thoughts”.
 arm and art, from Old English and Old French, both ultimately from Proto-Indo-European h₂er-, "to fit, to fix, to put together, to slot"
 know, can, note, notice, noble,  ignorant, recognize, normal, cognition, narrate, notorious, gnome, paranoid, nous, and gnosis. From Old English (twice), Old French (5 times), Latin (4 times), and Greek (4 times). All can be derived partially or entirely from Proto-Indo-European ǵneh₃- "to recognise, to know".
 horse, hurry, carry, and car. From Old English (twice) and Gaulish (twice). All ultimately originate from Proto-Indo-European ḱers- "to run".
 the, that, this, and there. All originate from Proto-Indo-European só "this, that", via Old English.
 blink, blank, bleach, and bleak. All originate from Proto-Indo-European bʰleyǵ- "to shine" via Proto-Germanic.
 green, grey, and grow. All originate from Proto-Indo-European gʰreh₁- "to grow" via Old English.
 yellow, gold, glow, and gall. All originate from Proto-Indo-European ǵʰelh₃- via Old English.
 king, kind, kin,nation, gentle, general, generic, genre, gender, generous, nature, naive, native, germ, genie, engine, generate, genus,  genius, genitalia, genesis, gonad, and gene. From Old English (3 times), Old French (13 times), Latin (4 times) and Greek (3 times). All ultimately from Proto-Indo-European ǵenh₁- "to produce, to beget, to give birth".

There are many more doublets from Greek, where one form is a vernacular borrowing, and the other a learned borrowing, such as scandal and slander, both from σκάνδαλον.

Norman vs. standard or Modern French
Many words of French origin were borrowed twice or more. There were at least three periods of borrowing: one that occurred shortly after the Norman Conquest and came from Norman French, one in the thirteenth and fourteenth centuries from standard (Parisian) French at the time when English nobles were switching from French to English, and a third one during the sixteenth to nineteenth century, when France was at the height of its power and international influence. Examples of doublets from the first and second periods are catch vs. chase, cattle vs. chattel, and warden vs. guardian. More recent borrowings are often distinguished by maintaining the French spelling and pronunciation, e.g. chef (vs. chief), pâté (vs. paste), fête (vs. feast). There are multiple doublets caused by the w → g and ca → cha sound changes, which happened in standard French but not Norman French.

Chinese

Derivative cognates are a classification of Chinese characters which have similar meanings and often the same etymological root, but which have diverged in pronunciation and meaning. At one time they were pronounced similarly and meant "old (person)." ( in Standard Mandarin) has retained this meaning, but   now mainly means "examine".

Differing literary and colloquial readings of certain Chinese characters are common doublets in many Chinese varieties, and the reading distinctions for certain phonetic features often typify a dialect group. 
For a given Chinese variety, colloquial readings typically reflect native vernacular phonology. Literary readings are used in some formal settings (recitation, some loanwords and names) and originate from other, typically more prestigious varieties. 
Sometimes literary and colloquial readings of the same character have different meanings. For example, in Cantonese, the character  can have the colloquial pronunciation  ("inexpensive"), and the literary pronunciation  ("flat").

Irish

The words píosa and cuid (both meaning "part" or "portion") form an Irish doublet, both from the Proto-Celtic root *kʷesdis. This root became in Gaulish *pettyā, then was borrowed into Late Latin as pettia, Anglo-Norman piece, then Middle English pece, before being borrowed into Middle Irish as pissa, which became modern píosa. In Old Irish, *kʷesdis became cuit, which in modern Irish is cuid.

Japanese
In Japanese, doublets are most significant in borrowings from Chinese, and are visible as different on'yomi (Sino-Japanese readings) of kanji characters. There have been three major periods of borrowing from Chinese, together with some modern borrowings. These borrowings are from different regions (hence different Chinese varieties) and different periods, and thus the pronunciations have varied, sometimes widely. However, due to consistent Chinese writing, with cognate morphemes represented by the same character, the etymological relation is clear. This is most significant at the level of morphemes, where a given character is pronounced differently in different words, but in some cases the same word was borrowed twice. These have been very valuable to scholars for reconstructing the sounds of Middle Chinese, and understanding how the pronunciations differed between Chinese regions and varied over time.

New Indo-Aryan
For example, Hindi  'tiger' is derived by historical stages from Sanskrit  'tiger'. Meanwhile, Hindi has also directly borrowed the Sanskrit word , meaning 'tiger' in a more literary register.

Polish
Triplets:
  ‘piss’ (vulgar),  ‘spout’ (informal),  ‘pee’ (childish, euphemism; the latter is possibly an irregular diminutive of the former)

Spanish
Because Spanish is itself a Romance language already with many native words of Latin ancestry (transmitted orally, so with natural sound changes), the later written borrowing created a number of doublets. Adding to this was Spain's conquest by the Moors in the Middle Ages, leading to another vector for creating doublets (Latin to Arabic to Spanish).

Welsh 

Welsh contains many doublets of native origin, where a single Indo-European root has developed along different paths in the language. Examples of this are:

  "boiled, boiling" and  "enthusiastic" from Proto-Indo-European * "to boil, brew"
  "bed" and  "place" from Proto-Indo-European * "to lie (down)"
  "spring",  "dawn" and  "swallow (bird)" from Proto-Indo-European * "spring"
  "breath" and  "soul" from Proto-Indo-European * "to breathe"
  "mead" and  "drunk" from Proto-Indo-European * "honey, mead"

In addition to native doublets, Welsh has borrowed extensively over the centuries, particularly from Latin and English. This has led to many more doublets in the language, including many from Latin that entered Welsh via English borrowings. Examples include:

  "God",  "day" (both native),  "Thursday" (Latin) and  "journey" (Latin via French via English) from Proto-Indo-European * "to be bright; sky, heaven"
  "yoke (pulling frame)" (native) and  "yoga" (Sanskrit via English) from Proto-Indo-European * "to join, to tie together"
  "free" (native),  "argument" (Germanic via Latin and French via English) and  "friend" (English) from Proto-Indo-European * "to love, please"
  "Scotland" (Irish) and  "Alps" (Latin via English) from Proto-Indo-European *albʰós  "white"
  "needle",  "to spin" (both native),  "nerve" (Latin via English) and  "neuro-" (Greek via English) from Proto-Indo-European * "to spin, sew"

See also
 Reborrowing
 Cognate, specifically, those within the same language
 False friends that may develop in the same way

References

External links
 

Historical linguistics
Types of words